Acalolepta sumatrana is a species of beetle in the family Cerambycidae found in Asia in countries such as the Sumatra and Malaysia.

Acalolepta
Beetles described in 1940